Dominic "Dom" Evans (born 22 April 1970) is a British auto racing driver. He currently competes in the British GT Championship, driving for Blendini Motorsport in a GT3-class Audi R8 LMS.

Career

Early career
Born in Cardiff, Evans competed in the Britcar championship in 2008, driving for XL Race Parts in a Porsche 911 GT3 Cup. He was partnered by three different drivers in the three races he entered: Roberts at Silverstone, Steve Bell at the first Brands Hatch round (where he got his best result, 17th, in the second race), and Mark Coleing at the second Brands Hatch round. In 2011, Evans won the Welsh Sports & Saloon Championship.

British GT
Evans first appeared in the British GT Championship in 2012, driving alongside fellow debutant Zoë Wenham for Century Motorsport in a GT4-class Ginetta G50. Having missed the first round due to licensing issues (with his seat being filled by Ginetta's Mark Simpson), Evans made his debut at the second round of the season, held at the Nürburgring GP circuit. He and Wenham finished third in the first race, and second in race two, in what proved to be a successful debut event for Evans. The season would prove to be a successful one; although a victory eluded the pairing of Evans and Wenham, Wenham was still competing for the title with two races to go (with Evans competing for the runner-up spot, as he had missed the first two races.) Following that event, however, Evans had to settle for third place, the title being won by Team WFR and their driver pairing of Jody Fannin and Warren Hughes.

For 2013, Evans moved into the GT3 category, now driving for Blendini Motorsport, alongside team boss Tom Roche in an Audi R8 LMS. It would not prove to be a successful GT3 debut for him, as he and Roche were only able to finish 18th overall in both races. He competed in four more races during the season, but did not score any points.

Personal life
Evans has a son, Josh, whom competes in the Mazda MX5 Championship.

References

Living people
British GT Championship drivers
Welsh racing drivers
1970 births
Sportspeople from Cardiff